Jhaukhel is a town and former village development committee that is now part of Changunarayan Municipality in Province No. 3 of central Nepal. As of 2012, the population was 16,918. Most people are engaged in agriculture. About 80% of inhabitants are Newar people.

References

Populated places in Bhaktapur District